Michaela Ebert  (born ) is a German female track cyclist, representing Germany at international competitions. She competed at the 2016 UEC European Track Championships in the team pursuit.

Major results
2017
2nd Madison, Oberhausen (with Lisa Küllmer)
3rd Madison, GP Zürich - Oerlikon (with Lisa Küllmer)

References

1997 births
Living people
German female cyclists
German track cyclists
Place of birth missing (living people)
20th-century German women
21st-century German women